James Leigh may refer to:

 James Henry Leigh, English MP for Winchester
 James Mathews Leigh (1808–1860), English art educator and painter
 James Wentworth Leigh (1838–1923), English Anglican priest
 James Leigh (cricketer) (1862–1925), English cricketer

See also

James Lee (disambiguation)
Leigh (disambiguation)